Rampon (Rampó) was the second count of the Catalan counties of Barcelona and Osona from 820 until his death in 825.

After Bera was deposed, Louis the Pious, King of Aquitaine, gave his lands to a nobleman unconnected to the factional struggles that had developed in the Marca Hispanica. He chose the Frank Rampon, who had been a faithful servant to his father Charlemagne. He had been given the responsibility of telling Louis, then king of Aquitaine, of his father Charlemagne's death in Doué-la-Fontaine, Anjou, at the beginning of 814.

Rampon was ruler of Barcelona, Girona, and Besalú with the title of Count, but possibly also Margrave; the latter title was reserved only for the rulers of border counties.

In 821, the Court at Aachen ordered him to attack Muslim territory, an order which he carried out in 822, ransacking land up to the river Segre.

Rampon died in 825. However, it was not until an assembly in Aachen in February 826 that Louis designated his successor to be Bernard of Septimania, the son of William of Gellone, Count of Toulouse, and younger half-brother of Gaucelm, Count of Empúries and Roussillon.

8th-century births
825 deaths
Nobility of the Carolingian Empire
Counts of Barcelona
Counts of Girona
9th-century people from the County of Barcelona